Muhammed Alauddin Khan is a politician from Manipur, India. He is the Manipur state government minister for Minorities & Other Backward Classes, Rural Development & Panchayati Raj and Science & Technology. In 2007 he was elected to the Legislative Assembly of Manipur, as the Indian National Congress candidate in the constituency Keirao.

References

Indian National Congress politicians
Manipur MLAs 2007–2012
Living people
Year of birth missing (living people)
Manipur politicians